Patrick Hosotte (born 25 July 1957) is a French racing cyclist. He rode in the 1981 Tour de France.

References

1957 births
Living people
French male cyclists
Place of birth missing (living people)